Astrorama is an album by French Jazz fusion artist Jean-Luc Ponty and Japanese Avant-Garde artist Masahiko Satoh. It was released in 1970 on Toshiba EMI. The album was recorded live in Tokyo on August 29, 1970. Catalog: FAR EAST/TOSHIBA EMI (ETJ-65016)

Track listing

Side one 
"Golden Green" (Jean-Luc Ponty)
"And So On" (Masahiko Sato)

Side two 
"Astrorama" (Jean-Luc Ponty)
"Nuggis" (Jean-Luc Ponty)

Personnel
 Motohiko Hino – drums
 Yoshiaki Masuo – electric guitar
 Niels-Henning Ørsted Pedersen – bass
 Jean-Luc Ponty – electric violin
 Masahiko Satoh – piano, electric piano

References 

Jean-Luc Ponty live albums
1970 live albums
EMI Records live albums
Live jazz fusion albums